Epena is a village of 2000 people, and seat of Epena District in the Likouala Department of northeastern Republic of the Congo.
It is on the Likouala-aux-Herbes river, just east of the Lake Télé Community Reserve.

Notable residents
Aminata Aboubakar Yacoub - Congolese Olympic swimmer

References

Likouala Department
Populated places in the Republic of the Congo